Loreto High School Beaufort is a voluntary fee-paying Roman Catholic secondary school for girls located on the grounds of Beaufort House on Grange Road in Rathfarnham, South Dublin. It is across the street from Loreto Abbey.

History
Mother Frances Deasey bought Beaufort House in 1925. It became Beaufort Domestic Science College, with the ancillary buildings forming a kindergarten and junior school. A senior school building was added in 1952, and an extension including an assembly hall in 1975. The kindergarten and junior school were phased out in the 1990s.

South Dublin County Council greenlit a two-storey extension in 2017.

Sports
Loreto High School Beaufort offers a variety of sports including Hockey, Basketball and Camogie, with successful Leinster wins throughout the years. The school has a strong hockey tradition with 2 hockey pitches, the main pitch is water based grade, whilst the second pitch is half size.

BT Young Scientist
Students participate in the BT Young Scientist Competition

Notable alumni
Sarah Bolger (born 1991), actress
Siobhán Cullen (born 1990), actress
Danielle Galligan (born 1992), actress
Helen Keogh (born 1951), politician
Dervla Kirwan (born 1971), actress
Hannah Matthews (born 1991), field hockey player
Janet Mullarney (1952–2020), sculptor
Deirdre O'Kane (born 1968), comedian and actress
Olivia Tracey (born 1960), model and actress
Rosemary Smith (born 1937), rally driver

References

1925 establishments in Ireland
Catholic secondary schools in the Republic of Ireland
Educational institutions established in 1925
Girls' schools in the Republic of Ireland
Secondary schools in South Dublin (county)
Beaufort